Joseph R. Turnesa (January 31, 1901 – July 15, 1991) was an American professional golfer.

Early life 
Turnesa was born in New York, New York.

He was one of seven famous golfing brothers: Phil (1896–1987), Frank (1898–1949), Joe (1901–1991), Mike (1907–2000), Doug (1909–1972), Jim (1912–1971), and Willie (1914–2001).

Professional career 
Among his brothers, Joe won the most times (14) on the PGA Tour. The family was referred to as a "golf dynasty" in a 2000 New York Times article.

Turnesa finished second to Bobby Jones in the 1926 U.S. Open and second to Walter Hagen in the 1927 PGA Championship. He was a member of the U.S. Ryder Cup teams in 1927 and 1929.

Personal life 
Turnesa died in Florida in 1991.

Professional wins

PGA Tour wins (14)
1924 (1) Augusta Open
1925 (2) Texas Open, Pennsylvania Open Championship
1926 (2) Metropolitan PGA, Sacramento Open
1927 (3) Shreveport Open, Ridgewood Country Club Open, Sacramento Open
1930 (2) Metropolitan PGA, Massachusetts Open
1931 (1) Miami Open
1932 (2) Metropolitan PGA, Grassy Spain Course Tournament
1933 (1) Mid-South Open (tie with Willie Macfarlane and Paul Runyan)

Other wins (8)
Note: This list may be incomplete.
1929 Yorkshire Evening News Tournament, Lannin Memorial Tournament
1931 Florida Open (tie with Wiffy Cox)
1934 Long Island Open
1935 Connecticut PGA Championship
1936 Connecticut PGA Championship
1938 Long Island Open
1940 Long Island Open

Results in major championships

NYF = tournament not yet founded
NT = no tournament
WD = withdrew
CUT = missed the half-way cut
R64, R32, R16, QF, SF = round in which player lost in PGA Championship match play
"T" indicates a tie for a place

Summary

Most consecutive cuts made – 8 (1923 U.S. Open – 1928 U.S. Open)
Longest streak of top-10s – 2 (1927 PGA – 1928 U.S. Open)

See also
List of golfers with most PGA Tour wins

References

American male golfers
PGA Tour golfers
Ryder Cup competitors for the United States
Golfers from New York (state)
Sportspeople from New York City
1901 births
1991 deaths